French Postcards is a 1979 coming-of-age romantic comedy-drama film directed by Willard Huyck, who co-wrote the screenplay with Gloria Katz. It stars Miles Chapin, Blanche Baker, David Marshall Grant, Valérie Quennessen, Debra Winger, Marie-France Pisier, and Jean Rochefort. The film was shot on location in central Paris, and had a contemporary time setting, with American students being used as extras.

Plot
A group of American exchange students spend a year studying in Paris at the fictional Institute of French Studies, run by Madame Catherine Tessier and her husband Monsieur Tessier. Student Laura spends much of her time alone, visiting museums and art galleries and regularly sending postcards to her boyfriend back home who declined the opportunity to join her. Alex's interests are not so much in studying but more in love and life in Paris, and he becomes involved in a tryst with his teacher and the Institute's co-director Madame Tessier. Joel struggles with indecisiveness, which complicates matters when he falls in love with Toni, a local bookstore employee.

Cast

Reception

External links
 
 
 
 
 

1979 comedy-drama films
1979 multilingual films
1979 romantic drama films
1970s American films
1970s coming-of-age comedy-drama films
1970s English-language films
1970s French films
1970s French-language films
1970s German films
1970s romantic comedy-drama films
American coming-of-age comedy-drama films
American multilingual films
American romantic comedy-drama films
Coming-of-age romance films
English-language French films
English-language German films
Films about scandalous teacher–student relationships
Films about vacationing
Films directed by Willard Huyck
Films produced by Gloria Katz
Films scored by Lee Holdridge
Films set in Paris
Films shot in Paris
Films with screenplays by Gloria Katz
Films with screenplays by Willard Huyck
French coming-of-age comedy-drama films
French multilingual films
French romantic comedy-drama films
French-language American films
German coming-of-age comedy-drama films
German multilingual films
German romantic comedy-drama films
West German films